Glasperlenspiel is a German electropop duo from Stockach, consisting of vocalist Carolin Niemczyk, and keyboardist Daniel Grunenberg.

History

Carolin Niemczyk and Daniel Grunenberg were previously members of the Stockach-based band Crazy Flowers. The two later formed the duo Glasperlenspiel, and named themselves after the novel of the same name. They first came to public attention in Germany for competing in the Bundesvision Song Contest 2011, representing Baden-Württemberg with the song "Echt". They placed fourth and their song went on to become a top ten hit in Germany. Their debut studio album Beweg dich mit mir was released in September 2011, and was certified gold in Germany.

In 2013, they released the single "Nie vergessen" which became their second top ten hit in their home country. Their second studio album Grenzenlos was released in May 2013, and was later rereleased as Grenzenlos in diesem Moment. In 2015, they participated in the Bundesvision Song Contest 2015, representing Baden-Württemberg again with the song "Geiles Leben". They placed sixth in the final, and the song went on to peak at number-two in Germany and Austria, and number-one in Switzerland. Their third studio album Tag X was later released in May 2015. In 2018, Niemczyk became a judge on the fifteenth season of Deutschland sucht den Superstar. Owing likely to Niemczyk's Polish heritage, the duo represented Poland at the Free European Song Contest 2020 (organized, like Bundesvision, by ProSieben) with the song "Immer da," which finished eleventh.

Members

 Carolin Niemczyk — born , vocals
 Daniel Grunenberg — born , vocals, keyboard

Live members
 Bene Neuner — drums
 Markus Vieweg — bass, keyboard
 Nico Schliemann — guitar, keyboard

Discography

Studio albums

Singles

Featured singles

References

External links

2003 establishments in Germany
German synthpop groups
Musical groups established in 2003
Musical groups from Baden-Württemberg
Polydor Records artists
Participants in the Bundesvision Song Contest
German musical duos
Electronic music duos
Pop music duos
Male–female musical duos